Lisa Frank Inc. is a private for-profit company formed in 1979, under its founder and CEO, Lisa Frank. The company is known for its colorful, imaginative designs featured on a variety of media, such as school supplies and stickers.

Company history 
After graduating from Cranbrook Kingswood School in 1972 in Bloomfield Hills, Michigan, Lisa Frank attended the University of Arizona to study art.  She chose this field of study because art had been a large part of her life since childhood. Her father, an art collector, had influenced her. Between her sophomore and junior years, she made a line of plastic jewelry called Sticky Fingers. The line specialized in colorful fruit and novelty character pendants, utilizing popular characters in their designs such as Betty Boop. It sold in stores such as Neiman Marcus and Bloomingdales.

This jewelry line inspired Frank to create her first set of colorful stickers, the same stickers that launched her brand. She began Lisa Frank Incorporated in 1979, when she was only twenty-four years old. That year, the company received its first million-dollar order from Spencer Gifts. The company only produced stickers at first, featuring Frank's original characters and designs. All of Frank's designs through 1989 were colored with an airbrush technique, the process taking nine to thirty-six hours to complete. According to a 1983 interview with Frank, the company's sticker process began with a concept, moved to pencil sketch, and then translated into an 18×24" painting before qualifying for approval. An individual sticker, on average, took a minimum of three months to approve.

Lisa Frank Inc.'s success rocketed in 1987 when the company began producing school supplies featuring their original designs. These designs featured "classic" Lisa Frank characters such as Panda Painter. The company believes the original characters continue to be their most popular, despite new additions over the years. Lisa Frank's original commercial slogan, "You Gotta Have It", debuted in the late 1980s. Lisa Frank's line of products—folders, pencil cases, erasers, Trapper Keepers, and notebooks—were so popular, the company grossed over $60 million a year in sales during its peak in the 1990s.

In 1989, the company stopped using the time-consuming, hand-painted airbrushing technique and switched to using computer software. The technological age not only changed the way the company produced products, it has also had an effect on the products they sell. According to Frank, current designs feature more complicated and intricate patterns due to the technology and the variety of products the company creates today as compared to Lisa Frank Inc.'s starting years.

In September, 2005, Lisa Frank filed for divorce from her husband since 1994, James A. Green, then president and CEO of Lisa Frank Inc. They were the company's only stockholders. That same month, she sued to remove Green from the company, and he resigned the following month. Frank won a court settlement that year, stating Green must sell all his shares in the stock to her at a discount, according to a 1995 buy-sell agreement. This resulted in Frank resuming her position as CEO of the company. During the court trial, they found Lisa Frank Inc. grossed over $1 billion in sales since 1979.

In subsequent years, the company produced little stationery due to the dominance of electronic communication. Lisa Frank Incorporated developed two iPhone apps: One customizes pictures with Lisa Frank clip art, while the other is a coloring app for Lisa Frank coloring pages.

In 2012, Urban Outfitters began selling Lisa Frank vintage merchandise, such as 1990s stickers and Trapper Keepers, on the Urban Outfitters website.

As of 2015, the base of Lisa Frank Inc. headquarters is still Tucson, Arizona, encompassing a  building. The company earned an estimated $2.3 million in annual revenue in 2012. Its branded retail stores have since shuttered and its products, which once dominated back-to-school aisles in stores across the United States, are difficult to find today. The number of employees at the 320,000 square-foot building near the Tucson International Airport dwindled from a peak of about 500 to just six.

But a resurgence in popularity occurred in 2021 when Lisa Frank's 21-year-old son Forrest Green took over as Director of Business Development, starting by managing the company's Instagram account during the Pandemic as a student at UCLA, with the marketing strategy of Lisa Frank as a lifestyle. Since gaining over 700,000 followers, the company has made strategic partnerships with popular brands such as Morphe, Pillsbury, and Crocs creating throwback products for nostalgic consumers.

In popular culture
LFI's collaboration with Urban Outfitters in 2012 launched renewed interest in the company. The teen and young adult clothing retailer sells 1990s Lisa Frank merchandise on its website. Frank said LFI saves ten copies of every product they have ever made, and Urban Outfitters sells many reproductions of their vintage products. Urban Outfitters did a video interview with Lisa Frank to promote their collaboration with her brand. The interview video featured a brief clip from a 1993 Lisa Frank commercial featuring a ten-year-old Mila Kunis.

As of 2017, there is a Lisa Frank nail-art trend across the internet.

Lisa Frank Inc. was featured in Jeremy Scott's fall 2012 runway show in the form of a midriff corset covered in Lisa Frank stickers.

Vaporwave artist Macintosh Plus named a song after Frank, リサフランク420 / 現代のコンピュー (translating to Lisa Frank 420 / Modern Computing) was the leading single of her 2011 album Floral Shoppe.

In November 2020, Lisa Frank partnered with Morphe to launch Morphe x Lisa Frank, an eye shadow palette decorated with Lisa Frank characters.

In December 2021, Pillsbury and Lisa Frank produced the limited edition Lisa Frank unicorn shape sugar cookie dough, featuring the classic Unicorn, Markie.

Critiques of characters
A 2010 SF Weekly article criticized the sexualization of recent Lisa Frank characters. The article speculated LFI, following trends for a "sexy" appeal in children's toys, abandoned the "classic" Lisa Frank animal characters for sexual Bratz doll imitations.

There is criticism toward human Lisa Frank characters as being detrimental, as characters' designs follow unrealistic stereotypes instead of common body types.

References

External links
Official Website

American companies established in 1979
Privately held companies of the United States
Stickers
1979 establishments in Arizona